Rigby v Connol (1880) 4 Ch D 482 is a UK labour law case, concerning the right of a union member not to be expelled. It is no longer good law, having been superseded by Lee v The Showmen’s Guild of Great Britain and the Trade Union and Labour Relations (Consolidation) Act 1992.

Facts
Rigby wanted a declaration and injunction to prevent his expulsion from a union that operated a closed shop. The  rules of the "Journeymen Hatters' Fair Trade Union of Great Britain and Ireland", registered under the Trade Union Act 1871, said any journeyman whose son worked for a ‘foul shop’ (one where non-union workers were employed) would be fined £5 and entitled to no union benefits until the fine was paid. Rigby broke the rule and was expelled.

Judgment
Lord Jessel MR held that a union member’s right is founded on property, and because the member had disclosed no proprietary interest in the union in his statement of claim, he could not succeed.

See also

UK labour law

Notes

References

United Kingdom labour case law
Court of Appeal (England and Wales) cases
1880 in case law
1880 in British law